(lit. "Gathering of Intellect Publishing Co., Ltd.") is a Japanese company headquartered in Chiyoda, Tokyo, Japan. Shueisha is the largest publishing company in Japan. It was established in 1925 as the entertainment-related publishing division of Japanese publisher Shogakukan. The following year, Shueisha became a separate, independent company.

Manga magazines published by Shueisha include the Jump magazine line, which includes shonen magazines Weekly Shōnen Jump, Jump SQ, and V Jump, and seinen magazines Weekly Young Jump, Grand Jump and Ultra Jump. They also publish other magazines, including Non-no. Shueisha, along with Shogakukan, owns Viz Media, which publishes manga from all three companies in North America.

History 
In 1925, Shueisha was created by major publishing company Shogakukan (founded in 1922).  became the first novel published by Shueisha in collaboration with Shogakukan—the temporary home of Shueisha. In 1927, two novels titled Danshi Ehon, and Joshi Ehon were created. In 1928, Shueisha was hired to edit , a compilation. In the 1930s another novel called Tantei-ki Dan was launched and Gendai Humor Zenshū was completed in 24 volumes. In 1931 two more novels were launched, Danshi Yōchien and Joshi Yōchien.

After World War II, Shueisha started publishing a manga line called Omoshiro Book. Omoshiro Book published a picture book called Shōnen Ōja, which became a huge hit among boys and girls. The first full volume of Shōnen Ōja was released as Shōnen Ōja Oitachi Hen, which became an instant best-seller.

The first magazine published by Shueisha was Akaruku Tanoshii Shōnen-Shōjo Zasshi. In September 1949, Omoshiro Book was made into a magazine with all the contents of the former line. In 1950, a special edition of the magazine was published under the title Hinomaru. In addition to Omoshiro Book, a female version was published in 1951: Shōjo Book which featured manga aimed at adolescent girls. The Hitotsubashi building of Shueisha became completely independent in 1952. In that year, Omoshiro Book ceased publication and Myōjō began publication as a monthly magazine. The series of Omoshiro Book were published in bunkoban editions under the Omoshiro Manga Bunko line. A novel called Yoiko Yōchien was published and Omoshiro Book was replaced with another children's manga magazine called Yōnen Book.

In 1955, the success of Shōjo Book led to the publication of currently running Ribon. The novel Joshi Yōchien Kobato began publication in 1958. On November 23, a special issue of Myōjō titled Weekly Myōjō was released. In 1951, another male edition of Shōjo Book was released, Shōnen Book was made, and Shōjo Book series were released in bunkoban editions under the Shōjo Manga Bunko imprint. In the 1960s, another spin-off issue of Myōjō was released called Bessatsu Weekly Myōjō.

Shueisha continues to publish many novels. A compilation of many Omoshiro Book series was released as Shōnen-Shōjo Nippon Rekishi Zenshū complete in 12 volumes. Many other books were published including Hirosuke Yōnen Dōwa Bungaku Zenshū, Hatachi no Sekkei, Dōdō Taru Jinsei, Shinjin Nama Gekijō, and Gaikoku kara Kita Shingo Jiten. In 1962, Shueisha published a female version of Myōjō titled Josei Myōjō and many more novels. In 1963, Shueisha began publication of the widely successful Margaret with the additional offshoot Bessatsu Margaret. The novel Ukiyo-e Hanga was released complete in seven volumes, and the picture book Sekai 100 Nin no Monogatari Zenshū was released in the usual 12. In 1964, Kanshi Taikei was released in 24 volumes plus a reprint. In that year a line of novels, Compact Books, was made and a line of manga called Televi-Books ("televi": short for "television"). In 1965, two more magazines were made: Cobalt and the Shōnen Book offshoot Bessatsu Shōnen Book.

In 1966, Shueisha began publication of Weekly Playboy, Seishun to Dokusho and Shōsetsu Junior. A novel called Nihonbon Gaku Zenshū spawned a great 88 volumes. Another manga magazine was made titled Young Music. Deluxe Margaret began publication in 1967 and the additional Margaret Comics and Ribon Comics lines. In 1968 the magazine Hoshi Young Sense began publication as spin-off to the short-lived Young Sense. Later in that year Margaret launched the Seventeen magazine as a Japanese version of the English edition.

Shōnen Jump was created in the same year as a semi-weekly magazine. Another children's manga magazine was created in that year called Junior Comic and another Ribon spin-off called Ribon Comic. In 1969, the magazine Joker began publication along with guts. Several other novels were published. The magazine Bessatsu Seventeen began publication. In that year Shōnen Jump became a weekly anthology and changed its name to Weekly Shōnen Jump. Following up the end of Shōnen Book a spin-off of Weekly Shōnen Jump started at the same time as it became weekly, initially called Bessatsu Shōnen Jump. It changed its name to Monthly Shōnen Jump with the second issue.

The 1970s started with the launch of the novel magazine Subaru and in 1971 the Non-no and Ocean life magazines began publication. The novel series Gendai Nippon Bijutsu Zenshū spawned 18 volumes and became a huge seller. In 1972 Roadshow began publication and The Rose of Versailles begins in the Margaret Comics line gaining massive popularity. In 1973 Playgirl magazine began publication and the novel series Zenshaku Kanbun Taikei spawning a huge 33 volumes. In 1974 Weekly Shōnen Jump launched Akamaru Jump. Saison de Non-no launches.

Shueisha announced that in the summer of 2011, it would launch a new manga magazine titled Miracle Jump.

Headed by V Jump editor-in-chief Akio Iyoku, it is dedicated solely to Akira Toriyama's Dragon Ball and optimizing and expanding the brand.

On January 28, 2019, Shueisha launched the global English-language version of the online magazine Shōnen Jump+, titled Manga Plus. It is freely available in every country except China and South Korea, which have their own separate services. A Spanish-language version will be launched in February/March 2019, and may have a different library of content. Like the Japanese app, it has large samples of manga that can be read for free including all the current titles of Weekly Shōnen Jump, a sizeable number of titles from Shōnen Jump+ and some titles from Jump Square. However, unlike the Japanese version; the latest chapters of current Weekly Shōnen Jump manga are made available free for a limited-time and it does not sell content.

On March 31, 2022, Shueisha announced that it established a new wholly-owned affiliated subsidiary named Shueisha Games on February 16. The company will support other developers on over five ongoing projects, and to develop a mobile game with character design by a Weekly Shōnen Jump artist.

Magazines

Jump magazine line

Shōnen manga magazines

Seinen manga magazines

Other magazines

Apps and websites

Kanzenban magazines 
Shueisha has published many kanzenban magazines. Kanzenban magazines consist of one series being published for roughly a year and then another and so on, unlike normal manga magazines which have a variety of series. The select series has chapters from roughly three volumes in every issue.

Monthly Comic Tokumori 
 is a seinen kanzenban magazine published by Shueisha's subsidiary Home-sha. The magazine currently serializes the samurai-based Nobunaga no Kyodai Tetsu Fune: Sengoku no Umi o Seisu every month.

Shueisha Original 
 is a multi-demographic manga magazine published by Shueisha. It features an individual kanzenban of a classic Shueisha manga series. Each issue is a continuation of the last kanzenban. Shueisha Original has only featured two series which have run in the magazine for a long time. The first series was Chibi Maruko-chan from the shōjo manga anthology Ribon. Chibi Maruko-chan ran in the magazine from August 2007 to January 2008. Rokudenashi Blues by Masanori Morita which ran in Weekly Shōnen Jump started in March 2008 and is currently running in Shueisha Original.

Shueisha Remix 
 is one of many kanzenban magazines published by Shueisha. Shueisha Remix magazines are split into four lines: Shueisha Jump Remix, Shueisha Girls Remix, Shueisha Home Remix and Shueisha International Remix.

Weekly Shōnen Jump: Tokubetsu Henshū

Light novel imprints 
Cobalt Bunko - Shueisha's light novel imprint that's aimed at teenage girls.
Chiffon Bunko - A imprint focused on romance series.
Dash X Bunko - An imprint that targets males from their mid teens to their twenties. It publishes original light novels that contains various genres of: fantasy, science fiction, mystery, romance, history, horror. Published light novel works will have various adaptations, such as manga adaptations in Shueisha's Jump manga magazines, anime adaptations, deployment of mediamix works/projects, and movie adaptations.
Dash X Bunko Novel f - An imprint that is an off-shoot of Dash X Bunko that targets female audiences.
Jump J-Books - An imprint that have novelizations and spin-offs of manga from Weekly Shonen Jump.
Shueisha Orange Bunko - An imprint focused on women.
Super Dash Bunko - An imprint focused on teenage boys.

Shueisha English Edition 
Shueisha English Edition is an imprint of Shueisha. It publishes Japanese literature, including mystery, fantasy, horror and erotica, in English translation.

References

External links 

 
 
 

 
Hitotsubashi Group
Manga distributors
Magazine publishing companies in Tokyo
Book publishing companies in Tokyo
Comic book publishing companies in Tokyo
Educational book publishing companies
Online publishing companies
Software companies based in Tokyo
Video game publishers
Publishing companies established in 1925
Publishers of adult comics
Japanese companies established in 1925
Video game companies of Japan
Webcomic publishing companies
Anime companies